Channel 69 refers to several television stations:

Canada
The following television stations operate on virtual channel 69 in Canada:
 CFMT-DT-1 in London, Ontario

United States
The following low-power television station, which is no longer licensed, formerly broadcast on analog channel 69 (UHF frequencies covering 800-806 MHz) in the United States:
 KDFL-LP in Lubbock, Texas

See also
 Channel 69 virtual TV stations in the United States

69